StatesWest Airlines  was a commuter airline headquartered in Phoenix, Arizona that operated to destinations in the Southwestern United States.

History
StatesWest was founded by Phoenix entrepreneur Rudy Miller  in 1986 and began operating from its base at Phoenix Sky Harbor International Airport in 1987 with 36-passenger Short 360 turboprop aircraft. Later that year, 19-passenger British Aerospace BAe Jetstream 31 propjets were added to the fleet.  

During the airline's lifespan as an independent carrier, StatesWest served San Diego, California; Bakersfield, California; Burbank, California; Ontario, California; Orange County, California; Los Angeles, California; Tucson, Arizona; Lake Havasu City, Arizona; Bullhead City, Arizona; Prescott, Arizona; Sierra Vista/Fort Huachuca, Arizona and briefly to Las Vegas, Nevada as well as Albuquerque, New Mexico and Telluride, Colorado.

In late 1988, StatesWest determined the Short 360 and Jetstream 31 aircraft were inefficient for the company's mission. Both types were phased out in favor of 19-passenger Beechcraft 1900C turboprop aircraft. In 1989, the airline entered a small niche market by offering daily nonstop service between Scottsdale, Arizona and Orange County, California, but that route was discontinued in 1990. 

Future Scottsdale city council member and current mayor, W.J. "Jim" Lane was elected StatesWest president and chief operating officer on January 31, 1990. Shortly after, StatesWest discontinued all flying under its own name and entered into an agreement with USAir (which was renamed US Airways and has now been merged into American Airlines) to operate as USAir Express by providing code sharing feeder service to USAir hubs at San Diego (SAN), Los Angeles (LAX) and San Francisco (SFO) which were focus cities of the original Pacific Southwest Airlines (PSA) route system. USAir completed its acquisition of and merger with PSA in 1988. The USAir Express operation began on July 15, 1990, and also included flights at Phoenix (PHX) and Tucson (TUS).

During the contract with USAir, StatesWest acquired four Dash 8 aircraft that where later replace with 
three 13-passenger Beechcraft 1300 turboprop aircraft to supplement the fleet of B1900Cs. Many new routes were added including several that had been previously flown by Pacific Southwest Airlines (PSA) with jet aircraft and were later discontinued by USAir such as to Concord and Stockton, California. The aircraft were painted in USAir colors but included a smile under the nose thus remembering and honoring PSA which had been acquired by USAir 1n 1987. In late 1992 StatesWest declared bankruptcy and closed its doors the following year as USAir sharply reduced its operations in California.

USAir Express destinations in 1991

According to the Official Airline Guide (OAG), StatesWest was operating USAir Express service with Beechcraft commuter turboprop aircraft on behalf of USAir in 1991 via a code sharing agreement to the following destinations with hubs located in Los Angeles (LAX) and San Francisco (SFO)

 Bakersfield (BFL)
 Bullhead City/Laughlin
 Concord (CCR)
 Fresno (FAT)
 Los Angeles (LAX) - Hub
 Monterey (MRY)
 Ontario (ONT)
 Orange County (SNA)
 Palm Springs (PSP)
 Sacramento (SMF)
 San Diego (SAN)
 Santa Barbara (SBA)
 San Francisco (SFO) - Hub
 Stockton (SCK)

Fleet

StatesWest operated the following turboprop aircraft types at various times during its existence:

 Short 360
 BAe Jetstream 31
 Beechcraft 1900C
 Beechcraft 1300 (Super King Air modified for commuter airline operations)
 de Havilland Canada Dash 8-100

Destinations

StatesWest served the following destinations at various times during its existence, both as an independent airline and as an USAir Express air carrier:

Arizona

Bullhead City/Laughlin
Lake Havasu City
Phoenix
Prescott
Sierra Vista/Fort Huachuca
Scottsdale
Tucson

California

Bakersfield (US*)
Burbank
Concord (US*)
Fresno (US*)
Los Angeles
Monterey (US*)
Ontario
Orange County
Palm Springs (US*)
Sacramento (US*)
San Diego
Santa Barbara (US*)
Stockton (US*)

Colorado

Telluride

Nevada

Las Vegas

New Mexico

Albuquerque

(US*) designates destinations that were added after StatesWest became a USAir Express code share operator.

See also 
 List of defunct airlines of the United States

References

Defunct airlines of the United States
Airlines established in 1986
Airlines disestablished in 1993
1986 establishments in Arizona